In the 1968 season, the Cleveland Indians pitching staff led the major leagues with the most strikeouts (1157) while allowing the fewest hits (1087).

Offseason 
 October 17, 1967: Jim King was released by the Indians.
 October 26, 1967: Marv Staehle was sent to the Indians by the Chicago White Sox to complete an earlier deal (the White Sox sent Jim King and a player to be named later to the Indians for Rocky Colavito) made on July 29, 1967.
 November 28, 1967: Darrell Sutherland was drafted by the Indians from the New York Mets in the 1967 minor league draft.
 November 28, 1967: Eddie Fisher was traded by the Baltimore Orioles with Bob Scott (minors) and John Scruggs (minors) to the Cleveland Indians for Gordy Lund and John O'Donoghue.
 January 27, 1968: Rick Sawyer was drafted by the Indians in the 3rd round of the 1968 Major League Baseball draft Secondary Phase.

Regular season

Transactions
 June 7, 1968: Vince Colbert was drafted by the Cleveland Indians in the 11th round of the 1968 amateur draft.

Season standings

Record vs. opponents

Opening Day Lineup

Roster

Player stats

Batting

Starters by position 
Note: Pos = Position; G = Games played; AB = At bats; H = Hits; Avg. = Batting average; HR = Home runs; RBI = Runs batted in

Other batters 
Note: G = Games played; AB = At bats; H = Hits; Avg. = Batting average; HR = Home runs; RBI = Runs batted in

Pitching

Starting pitchers 
Note: G = Games pitched; IP = Innings pitched; W = Wins; L = Losses; ERA = Earned run average; SO = Strikeouts

Other pitchers 
Note: G = Games pitched; IP = Innings pitched; W = Wins; L = Losses; ERA = Earned run average; SO = Strikeouts

Relief pitchers 
Note: G = Games pitched; W = Wins; L = Losses; SV = Saves; ERA = Earned run average; SO = Strikeouts

Awards and honors 

All-Star Game

Farm system

References

External links 
1968 Cleveland Indians at Baseball Reference
1968 Cleveland Indians at Baseball Almanac

Cleveland Guardians seasons
Cleveland Indians season
1968 in sports in Ohio